Heroes Against Hunger is a 1986 all-star benefit comic book for African famine relief and recovery. Published by DC Comics in the form of a "comic jam" or exquisite corpse, the book starred Superman and Batman. Spearheaded by Jim Starlin and Bernie Wrightson, all proceeds from the comic went to hunger relief in Africa.

Publication history 
Heroes Against Hunger came about in response to the devastating 1983–85 famine in Ethiopia. The concept was nearly identical to the earlier benefit comic, Heroes for Hope, published by Marvel Comics in 1985 (which was also spearheaded by Wrightson and Starlin), and was in the spirit of contemporaneous musical fund-raisers like Band Aid's "Do They Know It's Christmas?", USA for Africa's "We Are the World", and the Live Aid concerts.

Plot 
In a story called "A Song of Pain and Sorrow!", Superman, Batman, and Lex Luthor try to curtail the Ethiopian famine. While there, they interact with Peace Corps member Lee Ann Layton. Their antagonist is a green-skinned, four-armed giant with a keyboard embedded on his chest called the Master. The Master feeds on entropy, so he is strengthened by the Ethiopian famine.

Contributors 
The story was plotted by Jim Starlin with a plot assist from Bernie Wrightson. The editor was Robert Greenberger. Front cover penciled by Neal Adams, with inks by Dick Giordano; back cover by Bill Sienkiewicz. Logo design by Gaspar Saladino.

There were 100 contributors to the project. In addition to Starlin and Wrightson, a number of Heroes for Hope contributors also donated their creative labors to Heroes Against Hunger, including John Byrne, Howard Chaykin, John Costanza, Steve Englehart, Klaus Janson, Jeffrey Catherine Jones, Michael Kaluta, Steve Leialoha, Al Milgrom, Gray Morrow, Josef Rubinstein, Bill Sienkiewicz, Walt Simonson, and Alan Weiss.

See also 
 Heroes for Hope
 9-11 (comics)

Further reading 
 "Reviews: Heroes Against Hunger", Amazing Heroes #95 (May 15, 1986).
 Monaco, Steve: "Sentimentality in the Mainstream", The Comics Journal #112 (Nov. 1986), pp. 52–58.

References

Notes

Sources consulted 

 Heroes Against Hunger at ComicVine

External links 

 Peron, Nick. "PSA'S FROM HELL: HEROES AGAINST HUNGER", Trouble City (July 26, 2017)

1986 comics debuts
1986 in comics
Art for charity
Comics by Doug Moench
Comics by George Pérez
Comics by Gerry Conway
Comics by Howard Chaykin
Comics by Jack Kirby
Comics by Jim Starlin
Comics by J. M. DeMatteis
Comics by John Byrne (comics)
Comics by Keith Giffen
Comics by Len Wein
Comics by Marv Wolfman
Comics by Michael Fleisher
Comics by Paul Kupperberg
Comics by Paul Levitz
Comics by Roy Thomas
Comics by Steve Englehart
Comics by Walt Simonson
DC Comics one-shots
Defunct American comics